April Smith may refer to:

April Smith (folk-rock singer), leader of the American folk-rock indie group April Smith and the Great Picture Show
April Smith (writer), American mystery writer and television producer
April Smith, winner of the 1989 Miss Missouri Teen USA pageant
April Smith, a character in School for Scoundrels